China competed at the 1992 Summer Paralympics held in Barcelona, Spain.

Medalists

See also
China at the Paralympics
China at the 1992 Summer Olympics
Sports in China

References

External links
Barcelona 1992 Press Release - IPC
International Paralympic Committee
National Paralympic Committee of China (NPCC) - short introduction

Nations at the 1992 Summer Paralympics
1992
Paralympics